Autoroute 25 (or A-25, also called Autoroute Louis-H.-La Fontaine in Montreal) is an Autoroute in the Lanaudière region of Quebec. A-25 has one toll bridge, which is the first modern toll in the Montreal area and one of two overall in Quebec (after being joined by the A-30 toll bridge, which opened in 2012).

A-25 begins at an interchange with A-20 and Route 132 in Longueuil and quickly enters the Louis Hippolyte Lafontaine Bridge-Tunnel into the east end of Montreal. It is the main north-south freeway in the east end of Montreal (actually northwest-southeast but perpendicular to the St. Lawrence River).

Before the Montreal-Laval Extension, a gap existed in A-25 north of the interchange with Autoroute 40. Instead it followed Boulevard Henri-Bourassa to Boulevard Pie-IX, both of which are principal urban arterial roads. Boulevard Pie-IX north of Boulevard Henri-Bourassa was used as a temporary section of Autoroute 25 across the Rivière-des-Prairies to Autoroute 440. From there, A-25 proceeded east with A-440, then continued north and east of Laval.

The designation of Autoroute Louis-Hippolyte-Lafontaine is named after Louis Hippolyte Lafontaine, a 19th-century Lower Canada leader of what was then the Province of Canada.

A-25 is also part of the Trans-Canada Highway between the A-20 and A-40 interchanges.

History

Construction history

Montreal-Laval extension

Autoroute 25 has been extended under a public-private partnership. The 7.2 km section of highway joins the southern part of Autoroute 25 at Boulevard Henri-Bourassa in Montreal's East end and the northern part at Laval's Autoroute 440. The $207-million project will save some $226 million for the province since a private consortium will assume any cost overruns. A toll bridge using a RFID transponder automatic payment system spans the Rivière des Prairies and costs transponder-owning motorists $3.20 per crossing at peak hours (6-9 AM and 3-6 PM) and $2.24 per crossing the rest of the day. An additional $5.34 in administration fees is charged for motorists without transponders. The road opened on May 21, 2011. The highway has six lanes (three in each direction), while the bridge features three lanes in each direction with one reserved for public transit.

Now that the link between Montreal and Laval is complete, the temporary autoroute section connecting Boulevard Pie-IX to Autoroute 440 lost its A-25 designation. The new route designation for this section is Route 125.

The new span effectively joins the North Shore, Laval, Montreal, and the South Shore.

Environmental organizations have raised concerns that the highway extension will lead to an influx of automobiles entering Montreal and increase development pressure on agricultural land in Eastern Laval.

Exit list

See also

 Pie IX Bridge
List of bridges spanning the Rivière des Prairies
List of bridges Spanning the Saint Lawrence River
 List of crossings of the Rivière des Mille Îles
List of crossings of the Rivière des Prairies
 List of crossings of the Saint Lawrence River

References

External links

 MTQ information sheet on 2010 construction of A-25 toll bridge segment between Montreal and Laval
 A-25 at motorways-exits.com
 A-25 at Quebec Autoroutes
 Transports Quebec Map 
 Autoroute 25 @ AsphaltPlanet.ca

25
Quebec 025
Roads in Lanaudière
Roads in Laval, Quebec
Roads in Montreal
Transport in Mascouche
Transport in Terrebonne, Quebec
Public–private partnership projects in Canada